"Ultimate Wheels" is the fourteenth single by Japanese boy band KAT-TUN. It was released on February 2, 2011 by their record label J-One Records. The singles release is to coincide with the release of a new series of television commercials starring all five members of the group.

Single information
Fourteenth single release from KAT-TUN including songs "Ultimate Wheels" and "Two." This edition includes a bonus DVD with a music video of the title song and its making-of. Regular Edition (First Press) including songs "Ultimate Wheels," "Make Or Break," "Ultimate Wheels" (karaoke)," and "Make Or Break" (karaoke). Regular Edition including songs "Ultimate Wheels"," "Yoake Made," "Ultimate Wheels" (karaoke)," and "Yoake Made" (karaoke). Features alternate CD cover artwork.

Chart performance
In its first week of its release, the single topped the Oricon singles chart, reportedly selling 181,494 copies. KAT-TUN gained their fourteenth consecutive number one single on the Oricon Weekly Singles Chart since their debut with all their singles sold more than 200,000 copies and continued to hold the second most consecutive number one singles since debut with fellow Johnny's group, NEWS. 

By the end of the year, Ultimate Wheels was reported by Oricon to sell 210,749 copies and was later certified Platinum by RIAJ denoting over 250,000 shipments.

Track listing

Chart

References

External links
 "Ultimate Wheels" Product Information

KAT-TUN songs
2011 singles
Oricon Weekly number-one singles
Billboard Japan Hot 100 number-one singles
Songs written by Wrethov
2011 songs